Calolziocorte railway station, formerly called Calolziocorte-Olginate, is a railway station in Italy. Located on the Lecco–Milan railway, where the line to Bergamo diverges, it serves the municipalities of Calolziocorte and Olginate.

See also 
 Milan suburban railway service

References

External links 

Railway stations in Lombardy
Milan S Lines stations
Railway stations opened in 1863